Amberd; known as Franganots until 1978, is a village in the Armavir Province of Armenia. The village is home to the historic church of Thomas the Apostle, dating back to the 12th century.

See also 
Armavir Province

References

World Gazeteer: Armenia – World-Gazetteer.com

Populated places in Armavir Province